Cape Laird is a rocky cape  northwest of Cape May, along the west side of the Ross Ice Shelf, Antarctica. It was named by the New Zealand Geological Survey Antarctic Expedition (NZGSAE) (1960–61) for Malcolm G. Laird, a NZGSAE geologist who took a special interest in the peneplain surface above the cape's granite cliffs.

References

Headlands of the Ross Dependency
Shackleton Coast